The city mayor of Wrocław serves as the head of Wrocław municipal executive. Before 1945 Wrocław was known as Breslau and was governed by Bürgermeisters (see List of mayors of Breslau).

List of city mayors (1809-1945)

List of city mayors (1945-present)

 Bolesław Drobner (14.03.1945–9.06.1945)
 Aleksander Wachniewski (13.06.1945–15.02.1947) 
 Bronisław Kupczyński (15.02.1947 – VI 1950)
 Marian Czuliński (6.12.1973–31.05.1975)
 Stanisław Apoznański (25.05.1984–13.12.1985) 
 Stefan Skąpski (26.03.1986–4.06.1990) 
 Bogdan Zdrojewski (5.06.1990–8.05.2001) 
 Stanisław Huskowski (8.05.2001–19.11.2002) 
 Rafał Dutkiewicz (19.11.2002–19.11.2018) 
 Jacek Sutryk (since 19.11.2018)

Chairman of the MRN Bureau
 Józef Barczyk (VI 1950 – XI 1952) 
 Marian Dryll (XI 1952 – IV 1956)

Chairman of the Council
 Eugeniusz Król (4.04.1956–2.02.1958) 
 Bolesław Iwaszkiewicz (2.02.1958–7.06.1969) 
 Stanisław Panek (7.06.1969–6.12.1972) 
 Marian Czuliński (6.12.1972–6.12.1973)

Voivodes
 Zbigniew Nadratowski (1975-1979) 
 Janusz Owczarek (1979–1984)

See also
 Timeline of Wrocław

External links 
Liste der Oberbürgermeister seit 1809 bis 1933 auf http://wrosystem.um.wroc.pl (PDF; 2,1 MB)
Für die Amtsträger von 1933 bis 1945 siehe:  
Henryk Grzybowski: Paul Matting, Erfolgs- und Kriegszeit-Bürgermeister, in: „Altheider Weihnachtsbrief“, Ausgabe 15, Dezember 2011, S. 144–159.

Notes and references

History of Wrocław
 
Lists of mayors of places in Poland